Cuming County is a county in the U.S. state of Nebraska. As of the 2010 United States Census, the population was 9,139. Its county seat is West Point.

In the Nebraska license plate system, Cuming County is represented by the prefix 24 since it had the 24th largest number of vehicles registered in the state when the license plate system was established in 1922.

History
Cuming County was formed in 1855 and organized in 1857. It was named for Thomas B. Cuming, the first secretary (and twice Acting Governor) of the newly created Nebraska Territory (1854–1858).

The courthouse dates from the 1950s.

On August 26, 2019, the DHHS announced that West Point's water was unsafe to drink after a year of complaints from citizens of the town. The maximum safe level of manganese for infants had been exceeded by over 700 micrograms per mL.

Geography

Major highways

  U.S. Highway 275
  Nebraska Highway 9
  Nebraska Highway 15
  Nebraska Highway 16
  Nebraska Highway 32
  Nebraska Highway 51

Adjacent counties

 Thurston County – northeast
 Burt County – east
 Dodge County – south
 Colfax County – southwest
 Stanton County – west
 Wayne County – northwest

Demographics

As of the 2000 United States Census, there were 10,203 people, 3,945 households, and 2,757 families in the county. The population density was 18 people per square mile (7/km2). There were 4,283 housing units at an average density of 8 per square mile (3/km2). The racial makeup of the county was 95.88% White, 0.13% Black or African American, 0.28% Native American, 0.20% Asian, 0.03% Pacific Islander, 2.63% from other races, and 0.85% from two or more races. 5.48% of the population were Hispanic or Latino of any race. 67.4% were of German and 5.6% American ancestry.

There were 3,945 households, out of which 32.60% had children under the age of 18 living with them, 61.70% were married couples living together, 5.30% had a female householder with no husband present, and 30.10% were non-families. 27.10% of all households were made up of individuals, and 14.90% had someone living alone who was 65 years of age or older. The average household size was 2.53 and the average family size was 3.08.

The county population contained 27.20% under the age of 18, 6.50% from 18 to 24, 25.20% from 25 to 44, 20.90% from 45 to 64, and 20.20% who were 65 years of age or older. The median age was 39 years. For every 100 females there were 102.10 males. For every 100 females age 18 and over, there were 99.20 males.

The median income for a household in the county was $33,186, and the median income for a family was $38,369. Males had a median income of $26,577 versus $19,246 for females. The per capita income for the county was $16,443. About 7.00% of families and 9.00% of the population were below the poverty line, including 9.80% of those under age 18 and 7.80% of those age 65 or over.

Communities

Cities
 West Point (county seat)
 Wisner

Villages
 Bancroft
 Beemer

Unincorporated communities
 Aloys

Townships

 Bancroft
 Beemer
 Bismark
 Blaine
 Cleveland
 Cuming
 Elkhorn
 Garfield
 Grant
 Lincoln
 Logan
 Monterey
 Neligh
 St. Charles
 Sherman
 Wisner

Politics
Cuming County voters are reliably Republican. In no national election since 1936 has the county selected the Democratic Party candidate (as of 2020).

See also
 National Register of Historic Places listings in Cuming County, Nebraska

References

 
1857 establishments in Nebraska Territory
Populated places established in 1857